Boulder Wash Cove is a cove in Lake Mead, in Clark County, Nevada. Boulder Wash for which the cove is named has its mouth in the cove at an elevation of 1,204 / 367 meters when the reservoir is at its full level.

References

Lakes of Clark County, Nevada
Boulder Wash Cove
Boulder Wash Cove